The Very Best of The Jam is the third greatest hits package (fourth including Compact Snap!) from The Jam. The compilation was released on 25 October 1997, and features all of The Jam's singles in chronological order.

This compilation album contains the same tracks previously released upon the 1991 album Greatest Hits, although The Very Best of The Jam contains two further tracks: "'A' Bomb in Wardour Street" and "Dreams of Children". This compilation also has a similar track listing to Compact Snap! with "Just Who Is the 5 O'Clock Hero?" replacing "Smithers-Jones".

"The Bitterest Pill (I Ever Had to Swallow)" was released as a single in 1997 to promote the album; it had previously been released as a single in 1982.

A VHS cassette of 15 music videos to songs released upon this album was also released. These 15 music videos were previously released upon the Snap VHS in 1983.

Track listing

Charts

References

1997 greatest hits albums
The Jam albums
Polydor Records compilation albums